John Michael Cocoris (September 17, 1877 – 1944) was a Greek businessman.

Born in Leonidio, he came to New York City in 1895 to work in the sponge trade. In 1896, he worked with John K. Cheyney in Tarpon Springs, Florida. In 1905, he introduced sponge diving to the area and recruited Greek sponge divers from the Dodecanese Islands. By the 1930s, the sponge industry of Tarpon Springs was very productive, generating millions of dollars a year.

He died in 1944 in Duval County, Florida.

See also
Greek American

References

Leo Polopolu. A Brief History of Hellenism in Florida.

External links
History of the Tarpon Sponge Industry
Sponge fishing in Key West and Tarpon Springs

1877 births
1944 deaths
Greek businesspeople
Greek emigrants to the United States
Sponge diving
People from Leonidio
19th-century Greek Americans